The 2013 Virginia gubernatorial election took place on November 5, 2013, to elect the governor of Virginia. The incumbent governor, Republican Bob McDonnell, was not eligible to run for re-election due to term limits established by the Virginia Constitution. Virginia is the only state that prohibits its governor from serving immediate successive terms.

Three candidates appeared on the ballot for Governor: Republican Ken Cuccinelli, the Attorney General of Virginia; Democrat Terry McAuliffe, a businessman and the former chairman of the Democratic National Committee; and Libertarian Robert Sarvis, a lawyer and businessman. 

McAuliffe won the election and was sworn in as governor on January 11, 2014. This is the only time since 1973 that a member of the incumbent President's party was elected Governor of Virginia. As in every Virginia gubernatorial election since 1977 the political party of the president at the time lost the election, even when the state of Virginia had strongly voted for the president in question. However, this pattern has only been broken in this election, with McAuliffe's victory coming during President Barack Obama's second term as president. This was the first Virginia gubernatorial election since 1965 in which no candidate won an outright majority of the vote.

Candidates

Republican Party

Lieutenant Governor Bill Bolling, elected to the post in 2005, made a deal with McDonnell whereby Bolling would run for re-election as lieutenant governor in 2009, enabling McDonnell to run for governor without a primary, in exchange for McDonnell's support in 2013. After the 2009 election, Bolling made no secret of his intention to run for governor in 2013, while Attorney General of Virginia Ken Cuccinelli openly stated that he was considering three options: a run for re-election as attorney general in 2013, running for the U.S. Senate in 2014, and running for governor in 2013. Cuccinelli announced to colleagues on December 1, 2011, that he was indeed running for governor. Bolling responded on the same day that he was disappointed that Cuccinelli decided to challenge him.

Bolling, who was polling poorly against Cuccinelli, withdrew from the race on November 28, 2012. He cited the Republican Party's decision to move to a nominating convention rather than hold a primary. He ruled out running for another term as lieutenant governor and refused to endorse Cuccinelli. Bolling considered running as an independent, but decided against it. Bolling also rejected the possibility of a write-in campaign.

Nominee
 Ken Cuccinelli, Attorney General of Virginia

Cuccinelli became the de facto nominee after being the only candidate to file to run by the deadline, and was formally nominated at the state Republican convention on May 18, 2013.

Withdrew
 Bill Bolling, Lieutenant Governor of Virginia

Declined
 George Allen, former U.S. Senator and former Governor
 Thomas M. Davis, former U.S. Representative
 Jeff McWaters, state senator

Polling

Democratic Party

Nominee
 Terry McAuliffe, businessman and former chairman of the Democratic National Committee (campaign)

On April 2, 2013, the Democratic Party of Virginia certified that McAuliffe was the only candidate to file for the June primary and therefore the Democratic nominee.

Declined
 Ward Armstrong, former Minority Leader of the Virginia House of Delegates
 Tom Perriello, former U.S. Representative
 Chap Petersen, state senator
 Mark Warner, U.S. Senator and former Governor

Libertarian Party

Nominee
 Robert Sarvis, lawyer, entrepreneur and software developer

On April 21, 2013, the Libertarian Party of Virginia held a special convention and nominated Sarvis as the party's official gubernatorial candidate.

Sarvis' campaign submitted over 17,000 signatures to meet the Virginia State Board of Elections (SBE) requirement of 10,000 valid signatures. On June 26, 2013, the SBE confirmed to Sarvis' campaign that he would be listed on the ballot statewide during the elections this November. This made Sarvis the fourth minor party gubernatorial nominee to get on the Virginia ballot in 40 years.

Write-in candidates

Declared
 John Parmele, Jr., navy retiree

Parmele announced his campaign as a write-in candidate in August 2013. Parmele unsuccessfully ran for the Virginia Beach City Council six times. In 2005, he ran as an independent for the 82nd district of the Virginia House of Delegates and lost to incumbent Harry Purkey.

 Tareq Salahi, reality television personality

Salahi planned to seek the Republican nomination, but left the party to launch an independent bid. However, he failed to submit the necessary signatures to the Virginia State Board of Elections by the June 11, 2013, deadline and did not appear on the ballot as an independent. He  transitioned his run into a write-in campaign and said he would pursue a congressional seat if he didn't win the governorship. Salahi also scheduled to have a film document his campaign by Campbell Media Group, but the production company faced legal allegations.

Declined
 Bill Bolling, Lieutenant Governor of Virginia

General election

Debates and forums
Cuccinelli challenged McAuliffe to a series of 15 debates around the state. McAuliffe refused, and called Cuccinelli's challenge "absurd" and a "gimmick". Cuccinelli responded, "McAuliffe's campaign might have dismissed the challenge, but it's clear that community leaders and Virginians share our desire to hold real debates across the Commonwealth."

Both candidates agreed to participate in three debates: July 20, 2013, in Hot Springs, sponsored by the Virginia Bar Association; September 25, 2013, in McLean, sponsored by the Fairfax County Chamber of Commerce and broadcast by NBC affiliates throughout Virginia; and a third debate on October 24, 2013, at Virginia Tech.

Cuccinelli declined to appear at the League of Women Voters/AARP debate, calling it a "left-wing, stacked debate". Cuccinelli accepted a debate invitation in Danville for a date in September or October; McAuliffe did not respond.

Sarvis was not invited to the debates or forums; some newspapers, including the Richmond Times Dispatch, The Roanoke Times, and The Daily Progress, called for his inclusion. Barton Hinkle of the Richmond Times Dispatch called the current debate process "stacked" suggesting that debate organizers are activists trying to influence the outcome of the election for their own ideological purposes. Sarvis said he would "debate anybody anywhere under any conditions."

McAuliffe and his campaign repeatedly declined to give a cost for his spending priorities, stating he would pay for them through unspecified government efficiency improvements, the Medicaid expansion, and federal money from Obamacare. McAuliffe said tax increases would not be on the table to pay for policy proposals. Cuccinelli's 2013 campaign conducted an analysis that found McAuliffe's spending plan would cost at least $14 billion – including $12 billion in new spending – over a four-year term and would translate into a $1,700 tax hike on the average Virginia family. McAuliffe's campaign accused Cuccinelli's campaign of "fabricat[ing]" the numbers.

Virginia Bar Association debate
Cuccinelli and McAuliffe met in their first debate on Saturday, July 20, 2013, at the Omni Homestead Resort in Hot Springs, Virginia, for the Virginia Bar Association-sponsored debate. Both major party candidates attacked their opponent's record, and they debated one another on issues including transportation, federal healthcare, abortion, Virginia Governor Bob McDonnell, same-sex marriage, and other topics. PBS' Judy Woodruff moderated the debate. Libertarian Sarvis was not invited to join the debate, but he attended the event to greet voters.

Virginia Farm Bureau forum
Cuccinelli and McAuliffe discussed their plans for Virginia's largest industry, agriculture and forest products, on Friday, August 2, 2013, at Wytheville Community College in Wytheville, Virginia. The candidates also discussed topics including transportation and healthcare. The forum was hosted by the Farm Bureau's Young Farmers Committee. Libertarian Sarvis was not invited.

Tidewater Community College forum
Cuccinelli and McAuliffe appeared Tuesday, August 6, 2013, at the Norfolk Waterside Marriott in Norfolk, Virginia at an event hosted by Tidewater Community College. Democrat McAuliffe argued that improving transportation would spur job creation, and he wanted to reform the Standards of Learning and Medicaid. Republican Cuccinelli focused on tax cuts as well as expanding opportunities for veterans and growing Virginia's ports. Libertarian Sarvis was not invited to the event, but a spokesman provided a statement about the libertarian candidate.

"Battleground Forum"
Cuccinelli and McAuliffe took the stage again on August 9, 2013, at the Hylton Performing Arts Center in Manassas, Virginia, hosted by the chambers of commerce from Loudoun, Prince William, Reston and Fredericksburg. Both Cuccinelli and McAuliffe answered a series of questions from representatives from each of the chambers that hosted the forum, and both were called out by the event's moderator for dodging specific questions. The sharpest exchange was between McAuliffe and the forum moderator Derek McGinty, an anchor on WUSA. McAuliffe declined to take a position on the proposed Bi-County Parkway, a controversial project that would cut through Manassas National Battlefield Park to connect Prince William and Loudoun counties. Libertarian Sarvis attended the event but was not included as a candidate, which led some political observers, such as the Franklin Center for Government and Public Integrity's project watchdog.org, to say that the number one thing missing from the forum was the invitation to include Sarvis. Four days after moderating the Battleground Forum, WUSA-TV news anchor Derek McGinty said Sarvis should be part of the conversation.

Energy forum in Arlington
The Consumer Energy Alliance, the National Ocean Industries Association (NOIA), the Thomas Jefferson Institute for Public Policy, and the Virginia Manufacturers Association co-hosted a forum focused on energy with Cuccinelli and McAuliffe on August 29, 2013. Libertarian Sarvis was not invited to the forum. The event took place at the George Mason University School of Law campus in Arlington. Both Cuccinelli and McAuliffe launched broad attacks on one another. Cuccinelli pointed out McAuliffe's inconsistent stances on coal and offshore drilling (McAuliffe made anti-coal and anti-offshore drilling statements during his 2009 campaign but has attempted to take a more centrist position in 2013). Cuccinelli also pointed to the GreenTech scandal enveloping McAuliffe. McAuliffe offered few specifics on his own energy policy plans but attacked Cuccinelli for his lawsuit of a Virginia Tech professor and expert on global warming whom he investigated for fraud, and said Cuccinelli's views on social issues would drive away businesses.

Fairfax County debate
The Fairfax County Chamber of Commerce and NBC4 hosted a debate between Cuccinelli and McAuliffe on September 25, 2013. NBC political journalist Chuck Todd moderated. The debate was held at the Capital One Bank headquarters in McLean, Virginia, and was aired live on NBC4 and NBC affiliates in Richmond, Charlottesville, Bristol and other Virginia cities. Throughout the debate, both McAuliffe and Cuccinelli attacked their opponent's records and views. McAuliffe focused on Medicaid expansion, failed to answer a question about the price tag of his education plan, and was exposed for not knowing that a state constitutional amendment is required to reverse the state's constitutional ban on same-sex marriage. Cuccinelli focused on his experience in office, defended his social views, and dodged a question about which loopholes he would close. After the debate, the Fairfax County Chamber of Commerce endorsed McAuliffe.

A spokesman said the debate would exclude Sarvis for "no other reason other than our tradition to provide a forum for the two major-party candidates." Sarvis attended the debate and his campaign debuted a television ad, which aired in Northern Virginia. The Sarvis ad caused Peter Galuszka of The Washington Post to say Sarvis "won" the debate. Five days after the debate moderator Chuck Todd invited Sarvis onto his show, The Daily Rundown, and asked Sarvis questions from the debate.

 Complete video of debate, September 25, 2013 - C-SPAN

Virginia Tech debate
Virginia Tech and WDBJ sponsored a debate between McAuliffe and Cuccinelli on October 24, 2013.

Prior to the debate, Cuccinelli agreed informally to participate, though his campaign asked questions about the rules, including to raise the threshold for a third-party candidate to participate, before formally agreeing. McAuliffe also agreed to the rules. Originally, the announced threshold for inclusion in the debate was ten percent in the polls. Later, it would be announced the threshold for inclusion in the debate was ten percent according to the RealClearPolitics average by the October 10 invitation deadline. On October 10, Sarvis was polling at 9% in the RealClearPolitics average, and WDBJ announced that Sarvis would not be included at the debate. Sarvis responded that the debate rules were "designed to exclude."

 Complete video of debate, October 24, 2013 - C-SPAN

Fundraising

McAuliffe's funds include $5.7 million from the Democratic Governors Association PAC; $950,000 from the Virginia League of Conservation Voters; over $294,000 he donated to himself; $250,000 from Baltimore Orioles owner Peter Angelos; $120,000 from the Liberian International Ship & Corporate Registry; $100,005 from his father-in-law, Richard Swann; and $100,000 from Bill Clinton. Cuccinelli's funds include $3.97 million from the Republican Governors Association PAC and $500,000 from the Republican Party of Virginia McAuliffe has received 34 contributions of $100,000 or more; Cuccinelli has received six contributions of $100,000 or more.

72% of McAuliffe's campaign contributors are from Virginia, but in the first quarter of 2013, 78% of his total funds came from donors from outside Virginia. 33% of Cuccinelli's funds in the first quarter of 2013 came from donors outside Virginia.

Through the first quarter of 2013 ending on March 31, 2013, McAuliffe had raised $6.7 million, and Cuccinelli had raised $4.4 million.

In the second quarter of 2013, McAuliffe raised $2.2 million, Cuccinelli raised $1.1 million, and Sarvis raised approximately $2,500. Terry McAuliffe's top five donors are from outside Virginia. Three of Ken Cuccinelli's top five donors are from out-of-state.

From July 1, 2013, through August 31, 2013, McAuliffe raised $7,355,246; and Cuccinelli raised $5,688,222. Over that period, McAuliffe received 2,010 contributions of more than $100, and 5,476 contributions of $100 or less; while Cuccinelli received 3,193 contributions of more than $100, and 7,075 contributions of $100 or less. During the same period, McAuliffe's biggest donations included the DGA ($2.7 million); the Virginia League of Conservation Voters ($900,000); the American Federation of State, County and Municipal Employees ($100,000); Laborers' International Union of North America Education Fund ($100,000); and the United Food and Commercial Workers Active Ballot Club Education Fund ($100,000). Cuccinelli's biggest donations included several energy companies and private individuals; his largest contribution over the period was $30,000. As of August 31, 2013, McAuliffe's campaign has $5,010,223 cash on hand, and Cuccinelli's campaign has $2,234,369 cash on hand.

Spending by outside groups
Tom Steyer's PAC NextGen Climate Action, Michael Bloomberg's PAC Independence USA, the National Education Association and the Planned Parenthood Action Fund have purchased a combined total of over $4.3 million worth of airtime for television ads supporting McAuliffe or opposing Cuccinelli. Americans for Prosperity, Citizens United, the Virginia Principles Fund PAC, National Rifle Association Political Victory Fund, the Ending Spending Fund, and the Fight for Tomorrow PAC have purchased a combined total of just over $2 million worth of airtime for television ads supporting Cuccinelli or opposing McAuliffe.  Purple PAC, a Libertarian-leaning super PAC, spent over $300,000 in television ads designed to boost the Sarvis campaign before election day.

Endorsements

Predictions

Polling
Aggregate polls

With Bolling

With Cuccinelli

Three-way race

Results
Polls indicated McAuliffe would win comfortably on Election Day. However, the race was much closer than expected. Cuccinelli led for a good portion of the evening. However, Fairfax County, a suburb of Washington D.C., is heavily Democratic, and is often one of the last parts of the state to count their votes. With around 90% of the vote McAuliffe took the lead for the first time. McAuliffe's lead continued to grow as Fairfax County came in. With 96% of the vote counted, CNN called the race for McAuliffe. At 10:06 P.M. EST, Cuccinelli called McAuliffe to concede defeat. Ralph Northam, also a Democrat, won the race for lieutenant governor, making the governor and the lieutenant governor both Democrats for the first time since 2006.

Results by county and city

Analysis
The result was somewhat surprising because many polls showed McAuliffe with a larger margin of victory over Cuccinelli than he ended up with. The Libertarian candidate was seen as having a large impact on the polls, his presence complicating them and adding "uncertainty to the ballot test". The polling for the lieutenant governor and attorney general elections, which did not feature a third-party candidate, was much more accurate. Although Sarvis also under-performed, his performance was among the three strongest of any Libertarian candidate running in a gubernatorial election and the best result for a third-party candidate in Virginia since 1965.

See also
List of governors of Virginia
2013 United States gubernatorial elections
2013 Virginia elections
2013 Virginia lieutenant gubernatorial election
2013 Virginia Attorney General election
2013 Terry McAuliffe gubernatorial campaign

Notes

References

External links

Polling data at RealClearPolitics

Virginia
November 2013 events in the United States
Gubernatorial
2013